Temnica is a village east of Kostanjevica in the Municipality of Miren-Kostanjevica in the Littoral region of Slovenia.

The parish church in the settlement is dedicated to Saint Peter and belongs to the Diocese of Koper.

References

External links
Temnica on Geopedia

Populated places in the Municipality of Miren-Kostanjevica